The 2019–20 Saint Peter's Peacocks men's basketball team represented Saint Peter's University in the 2019–20 NCAA Division I men's basketball season. The Peacocks, led by 2nd-year head coach Shaheen Holloway, played their home games at Yanitelli Center in Jersey City, New Jersey as members of the Metro Atlantic Athletic Conference. They finished the season 18–12 overall, 14–6 in MAAC play to finish in second place. As the #2 seed in the MAAC tournament, they defeated #7 seed Iona 56–54 in the quarterfinals. However, the semifinals and championship game, and all postseason tournaments, were cancelled amid the COVID-19 pandemic.

Previous season
The Peacocks finished the 2018–19 season 10–22 overall, 6–12 in MAAC play to finish in a three-way tie for ninth place. As the No. 9 seed in the MAAC tournament, they upset Marist before falling to Iona in the quarterfinals.

Roster

Schedule and results

|-
!colspan=12 style=| Exhibition

|-
!colspan=12 style=| Non-conference regular season

|-
!colspan=12 style=| MAAC regular season

|-
!colspan=12 style=| MAAC tournament
|-

|-

Source

References

Saint Peter's Peacocks men's basketball seasons
Saint Peter's Peacocks
Saint Peter's Peacocks basketball
Saint Peter's Peacocks basketball